Giandomenico Spinola (1580 – 11 August 1646) (also Giovanni Domenico Spinola)

Early life

Spinola was born in 1580 in Genoa. Though few records exist detailing his family background or education, he is listed as Questore (commissioner) of the Pontifical Office of the Treasury in his home town during the reign of Pope Paul V.

Ecclesiastic career

Later Spinola moved to Rome where, under the guidance of Archbishop of Genoa, Antonmaria Sauli, he was appointed to a number of administrative church positions.

Spinola was sent to the Archdiocese of Messina to act as administrator in 1625. Upon his return to Rome in 1626, he was elevated to the office of cardinal, with the Basilica of San Clemente as his titular church. He was also named as Protector of his homeland, the Republic of Genoa, becoming its official representative to the Holy See.

In 1629 Spinola was also given the title of Cardinal Priest of the Church of Santa Cecilia in Trastevere, holding both until he gave up that of San Clemente on 17 August 1637. In November 1630 he was named the Archbishop of Acerenza and Matera. He was consecrated bishop by Domenico de' Marini, Archbishop of Genoa, with Angelo Mascardi, Bishop of Noli, Pietro Francesco Costa, Bishop of Albenga, and Vincenzo Giovanni Spínola, Bishop of Brugnato, serving as co-consecrators. He was transferred to the episcopal see of Luni-Sarzana on 26 April 1632, retaining the personal rank of archbishop. He was again transferred, this time to the Diocese of Mazara del Vallo in Sicily as of 1 December  1636, still retaining the rank of archbishop.

Between 1642 and 1643 Spinola also served as Camerlengo of the Sacred College of Cardinals. He participated in the papal conclave of 1644 that elected Pope Innocent X.

Spinola died in Mazara in 1646, and was buried in the Chapel of San Gaetano in the Cathedral of Mazara.

References

1580 births
1646 deaths
16th-century Genoese people
17th-century Genoese people
17th-century Italian Roman Catholic archbishops
17th-century Italian cardinals
Cardinals created by Pope Urban VIII
Roman Catholic archbishops of Genoa
Burials in Sicily
Clergy from Genoa
17th-century Roman Catholic bishops in Sicily